Little Boy Lost is a sculpture created by the Australian artist Paul Trefry for the "Sculpture by the Sea" exhibition on Bondi and Tamarama beach, in 2009.  It is an over–sized silicone rubber and fiberglass sculpture made to resemble a toddler of approximately 18 months to 2 years of age, and for the duration of the exhibition, it was situated on Tamarama Beach, to the South of Bondi.

References

Outdoor sculptures in Australia
Buildings and structures in Sydney